The 29th Illinois General Assembly was elected in November 1874.  The session began on January 6, 1875 and adjourned on April 15, 1875.  No party had a majority in either chamber.  The Republicans had a plurality in both chambers, with 24 members in the Senate and 69 in the House, but control of the chambers was held by a coalition of Democrats, third parties, and independents.

The third parties represented in this session included the Opposition Party, the Independent Reform Party, and the Democratic Liberal Party, which took many of its members (including its leader, former governor John M. Palmer) and positions from the defunct Liberal Republican Party of 1872. All of these parties were organized for the first time in 1874 and disappeared shortly thereafter, their members subsequently becoming Democrats, Greenbackers, or independents.

The three-sided tensions between Democrats, Republicans and reformers led to frequent turmoil during the session, including a violent brawl that erupted in the House when Republican Alfred M. Jones threw a book at Democrat Lewis Plater. Partly due to this climate, fewer laws were passed during this session than any session since the 1830s; amounting to only 118 pages. The expenses incurred by this General Assembly were also commensurately lower, at $221,810—less than half the amount incurred by the preceding 28th General Assembly.

The 204 members of the 29th Illinois General Assembly are listed in the 1875 Illinois Legislative Manual.  Because the Manual is not entirely consistent in its labeling of third-party members of the General Assembly, those identified as "Liberal Republican", "Liberal", or "Democratic Liberal" are counted as a single group in the party totals below. Likewise, the one member of the House labeled simply as "Reform" is treated as a member of the Independent Reform Party for the purpose of the totals.

Senate

The Illinois Senate as elected in 1874 contained 51 members, one from each state legislative district.  Under the Illinois Constitution of 1870, Senators served overlapping 4-year terms; thus, 26 of the senators in the 29th General Assembly were elected in 1874, the remainder having been elected in 1872.  They ranged in age from 30 to 65.

Democrat Archibald A. Glenn was elected president of the Senate, thereby also taking on the role of acting lieutenant governor.

Party composition

The Senate of the 29th General Assembly consisted of 24 Republicans, 18 Democrats, and 9 third-party and independent members.

Members

House of Representatives

Under the Illinois Constitution of 1870, the state representatives were elected by cumulative voting, with each voter distributing three votes among the available candidates. The Illinois House of Representatives as elected in 1874 thus contained 153 members, three from each of the state's 51 districts. However, only 152 members were present for the 29th General Assembly, as Robert Thiem of Cook County failed to make an appearance.

The members of the House were overwhelmingly new; only 32 of them had previously served in the General Assembly. They ranged in age from 26 to 75; nearly half (72) were farmers. Among the 152 seated members, there were 70 Republicans, 41 Democrats, and 41 independents and reformers.

Opposition Party member Elijah Haines was elected Speaker by a coalition of Democrats, independents and reformers, despite lacking the support of some Democrats.

Party composition

Members

See also
44th United States Congress
 List of Illinois state legislatures

Citations

References

Further reading
Laws of the State of Illinois passed by the Twenty-Ninth General Assembly, convened January 6, 1875

Illinois legislative sessions
illinois
1876 U.S. legislative sessions
1875 in Illinois
1876 in Illinois